Rolf Kühn (29 September 1929 – 18 August 2022) was a German jazz clarinetist and saxophonist. He was the older brother of the pianist Joachim Kühn.

He lived in the United States from 1956 to 1959. John Hammond favourably compared him with Benny Goodman. In 2008, he founded band with Christian Lillinger, Ronny Graupe, and Johannes Fink.

Discography

As leader
 Streamline (Vanguard, 1956)
 Rolf Kuhn and His Sound of Jazz (Urania, 1960)
 Rolf Kuhn feat. Klaus Doldinger (Brunswick, 1962)
 Solarius (Amiga, 1965)
 Nana Und Rolf in Action: Make Love! (Intercord, 1969)
 R. K. Sextet (Intercord, 1969)
 Devil in Paradise (MPS/BASF, 1971)
 The Day After (MPS, 1972)
 Connection '74 (MPS/BASF, 1974)
 Total Space (MPS/BASF, 1975)
 Symphonic Swampfire (MPS, 1979)
 Cucu Ear (MPS, 1980)
 Don't Split (L+R, 1983)
 As Time Goes By (Blue Flame, 1991)
 Big Band Connection (Blue Flame, 1993)
 Affairs (Intuition, 1997)
 Inside Out (Intuition, 1999)
 Internal Eyes (Intuition, 1999)
 Smile: Famous Themes from Hollywood (Intuition, 2003)
 Bouncing with Bud (In+Out, 2005)
 Close Up (Jazzwerkstatt, 2009)
 Rollercoaster (Jazzwerkstatt, 2009)
 Stop Time! (Sonorama, 2014)
 Stereo (MPS, 2015)
 Spotlights (MPS, 2016)
 Yellow + Blue (MPS, 2018)

With Joachim Kuhn
 Re-Union in Berlin (CBS, 1965)
 Transfiguration (SABA, 1967)
 Impressions of New York (Impulse!, 1968)
 Monday Morning Hor Zu (Black Label, 1969)
 The Kuhn Brothers & the Mad Rockers (Metronome, 1969)
 Bloody Rockers (BYG, 1969)
 Going to the Rainbow (BASF, 1971)
 Brothers (Intuition, 1996)
 East Berlin 1966 (Another Side (of Jazz), 2006)
 Lifeline (Impulse!, 2012)

As sideman
With Horst Jankowski
 Gaste Bei Horst Jankowski (Metronome, 1962)
 Follow Me (Intercord, 1972)
 Starportrait/Follow Me (Intercord, 1975)
 Wonderful (Opera, 2003)

With others
 Eddie Costa, At Newport (Verve, 1957)
 Buddy DeFranco, The Three Sopranos (2001)
 Klaus Doldinger, Jubilee (Atlantic, 1973)
 Tommy Dorsey, The Tommy Dorsey Orchestra (Brunswick, 1958)
 European Jazz Ensemble, 20th Anniversary Tour (Konnex, 1997)
 Urbie Green, The Persuasive Trombone of Urbie Green (Command, 1960)
 Urbie Green, The Message (RCA, 1986)
 Friedrich Gulda, Music for 4 Soloists and Band No. 1 (SABA, 1965)
 Friedrich Gulda, Austrian Jazz Art: Friedrich Gulda and His Big bands (Amadeo, 2004)
 Greetje Kauffeld, Young Girl Sunday Jazz (Sonorama, 2015)
 Eartha Kitt, Thinking Jazz (ITM, 1991)
 Albert Mangelsdorff, Albert Mangelsdorff (Fabbri Editori 1981)
 Albert Mangelsdorff, Early Discoveries (Jazzhaus, 2016)
 Oscar Pettiford, Germany 1958/1959 (Jazzhaus, 2013)
 George Wallington, The Workshop of the George Wallington Trio & Eddie Costa Trio (Norgran, 1975)

References

External links
 
 
 

1929 births
2022 deaths
Musicians from Cologne
21st-century clarinetists
21st-century saxophonists
Brunswick Records artists
Columbia Records artists
MPS Records artists
European Jazz Ensemble members
German clarinetists
German saxophonists
Jazz alto saxophonists
Jazz clarinetists
Male jazz musicians
Male saxophonists
21st-century male musicians